Siniff Bay is a bay 13 nautical miles (24 km) wide between Verleger Point and Melville Point, along the coast of Marie Byrd Land. Mapped by United States Geological Survey (USGS) from surveys and U.S. Navy air photos, 1959–65. Named by Advisory Committee on Antarctic Names (US-ACAN) for Donald B. Siniff, leader of a United States Antarctic Research Program (USARP) party that studied population dynamics and behavior of Weddell seals in the McMurdo Sound area, 1971–72. He also worked in the McMurdo Station area the three preceding austral summers and participated in the International Weddell Sea Oceanographic Expedition, 1967–68. Siniff continued to study Weddell seals in McMurdo Sound for many years with his last trip to the Antarctic in 2000. He is retired from the University of Minnesota and serves as a professor emeritus. 

Bays of Antarctica
Bays of Marie Byrd Land